Michael Gleeson (born 1946 in Killarney, County Kerry) is an Irish former politician and sportsperson.

Sporting career
He played Gaelic football with his local club Spa and was a member of the Kerry senior inter-county team from 1969 until 1972. He was also a member of the Kerry junior team and won an All-Ireland Junior Football Championship medal in 1967.

He won three Kerry Senior Football Championships, a Munster Senior Club Football Championship and an All-Ireland Senior Club Football Championship with East Kerry. With Spa he won seven East Kerry Senior Football Championship titles and a County Intermediate Football Championship. During his college days in Dublin he won a Dublin Under 21 Football Championship with Erins Hope in 1966. He later played with UCD and won a Sigerson Cup with them.

Political career
He was a Killarney town councillor from 1991 to 2014; and a Kerry County Councillor from 1983 to 1991 representing the Labour Party; and from 1999 to 2021 as part of the Kerry Independent Alliance. He was an unsuccessful candidate at the 2011 general election. He has also been Mayor of Killarney. He retired from politics in May 2021 and was replaced on the council by his nephew John O'Donoghue.

References

 

1946 births
Living people
Alumni of University College Dublin
Alumni of St Patrick's College, Dublin
Independent politicians in Ireland
Irish sportsperson-politicians
Kerry inter-county Gaelic footballers
Local councillors in County Kerry
Mayors of places in the Republic of Ireland
Spa Gaelic footballers
UCD Gaelic footballers
Labour Party (Ireland) politicians